Elections to Stafford Borough Council were held on Thursday 2 May 2019.

Summary

Election result

|-

Ward results

Barlaston

Baswich

Common

Coton

Doxey and Castletown

Eccleshall

Forebridge

Fulford

Gnosall and Woodseaves

Haywood and Hixon

Highfields and Western Downs

Holmcroft

Littleworth

Manor

Milford

Milwich

Penkside

Rowley

Seighford and Church Eaton

St. Michael's and Stonefield

Swynnerton and Oulton

Walton

Weeping Cross and Wildwood

References

2019 English local elections
May 2019 events in the United Kingdom
2019
2010s in Staffordshire